Juhani Heinonen (born 19 July 1940) is a Finnish male curler and curling coach.

At the national level, he is an eight-time Finnish men's champion curler (1989, 1990, 1992, 1995) and four-time Finnish senior champion curler (2008, 2009, 2011, 2018).

Teams

Record as a coach of national teams

References

External links

Jussi Heinonen — jussiupn.kapsi.fi
Kiiskisen sisarukset aloittavat MM-urakan Mixed Doubles -curlingissa, Kauste kipparoi senioreja | Curling.fi
Hyvinkääläinen 50-vuotias monilajiharrastaja löysi uuden lajin ja voitti kuurojen EM-hopeaa | Urheilu | Aamuposti
Video: 

Living people
1940 births
Finnish male curlers
Finnish curling champions
Finnish curling coaches
Place of birth missing (living people)